Taunga is an island owned by the Noble (Matapule) ‘Akau‘ola  in Tonga. It is located in the south Vava'u Group in the far north of the country. The island had a population of 36 in 2021.

On 2 March 2007,  on Taunga and Ngau were leased by 'Akau'ola and the Government of Tonga to Warwick International Hotels for the construction of a hotel resort and spa.

References

Islands of Tonga
Populated places in Vavaʻu